Aphaenops bucephalus is a species of beetle in the subfamily Trechinae. It was described by Dieck in 1869.

References

bucephalus
Beetles described in 1869